Virginia Williamson (also Virginia Londner Green and Virginia Peschke) was the co-founder, owner and publisher of Byte magazine. She founded the magazine in 1975 together with her ex-husband, Wayne Green the founder/publisher of the amateur radio magazine 73. She sold the magazine to McGraw-Hill in 1979, but remained publisher until 1983. She later married Gordon Williamson, who in 1988 published a book about her ex-husband Wayne Green, titled See Wayne Run. Run, Wayne, Run. Williamson died in 2015.

References

American magazine founders
American publishers (people)
American women company founders
2015 deaths
Date of death missing
Year of birth missing
21st-century American women